John Elvet was an English priest in the late 14th and early 15th centuries.

Elvet was born in Durham and was in the service of John of Gaunt. The Master of the Jewel Office, he was Archdeacon of Leicester from 1392 to 1404.  He was succeeded as Archdeacon by his brother Richard.

References

See also
 Diocese of Lincoln
 Diocese of Peterborough
 Diocese of Leicester
 Archdeacon of Leicester

Archdeacons of Leicester
14th-century English people
15th-century English people
People from Durham, England